Philautus microdiscus (Kobo bubble-nest frog) is a species of frog in the family Rhacophoridae. It is endemic to India, only known from Abor Hills in Arunachal Pradesh (in the region also claimed by China). This little-known species inhabits tropical moist lowland forests.

References

microdiscus
Frogs of India
Endemic fauna of India
Amphibians described in 1912
Taxa named by Nelson Annandale
Taxonomy articles created by Polbot